Inga Kvalbukt (born 19 May 1949 in Alstahaug) is a Norwegian politician for the Centre Party.

She was elected to the Norwegian Parliament from Nordland in 1993, but was not re-elected in 1997. She had previously served in the position of deputy representative during the terms 1985–1989, 1989–1993 and 1997–2001. From 1999 to 2000, however, she met as a regular representative meanwhile Odd Roger Enoksen was appointed to the first cabinet Bondevik.

Kvalbukt was a member of Hemnes municipality council from 1979 to 1991.

References

1949 births
Living people
Members of the Storting
Women members of the Storting
Centre Party (Norway) politicians
20th-century Norwegian politicians
20th-century Norwegian women politicians
People from Alstahaug